Zevgolatio railway station is a train station in Zevgolateio in the northern Peloponnese, Greece. It was opened on 8 July 2012 on the section of the Athens Airport–Patras railway between Corinth and Kiato, and is located on the outskirts of the town near the A8 motorway between Athens and Patras. In July 2022, the station began being served by Hellenic Train, the rebranded TranOSE.

Services
Since 15 May 2022, the following weekday services call at this station:

See also
Railway stations in Greece
Hellenic Railways Organization
Hellenic Train
Proastiakos

References

Buildings and structures in Corinthia
Railway stations in Corinthia
Railway stations opened in 2012